Eric Malcolm Thomas Upshall (born December 24, 1951) is a Canadian provincial politician, who served as a Saskatchewan New Democratic Party member of the Legislative Assembly of Saskatchewan from 1986 to 1999.

He was first elected to the Legislative Assembly in the 1986 election in the constituency of Humboldt. He served in that district until the 1995 election, when he instead stood for re-election in the new district of Watrous. He was subsequently defeated by Donna Harpauer in the 1999 election.

References

1951 births
Living people
People from Yorkton
Saskatchewan New Democratic Party MLAs